Berta Zahourek-Blaha (January 3, 1896 in Vienna – June 14, 1967) was an Austrian freestyle swimmer who competed in the 1912 Summer Olympics.

She won the bronze medal in the 4×100 metre freestyle relay event, becoming the first Austrian woman to win an Olympic medal together with her teammates Margarete Adler, Klara Milch and Josephine Sticker.

She also participated in the 100 metre freestyle competition but was eliminated in the first round.

References

1896 births
1967 deaths
Swimmers from Vienna
Austrian female freestyle swimmers
Olympic swimmers of Austria
Swimmers at the 1912 Summer Olympics
Olympic bronze medalists for Austria
Olympic bronze medalists in swimming
Medalists at the 1912 Summer Olympics